The Marquam Manor is a historic residential building located at 3211 SW 10th Avenue in Southwest Portland, Oregon. It was constructed in 1930 by Elmer E. Feig and was listed on the National Register of Historic Places on May 27, 1993.

See also
 National Register of Historic Places listings in Southwest Portland, Oregon

References

1930 establishments in Oregon
Homestead, Portland, Oregon
Portland Historic Landmarks
Residential buildings completed in 1930
Apartment buildings on the National Register of Historic Places in Portland, Oregon